Les Cabannes may refer to:

 Les Cabannes, Ariège, in the Ariège department
 Les Cabannes, Tarn, in the Tarn department

See also
 Cabanes (disambiguation)
 Cabanès (disambiguation)
 Cabannes (disambiguation)